The Former Residence of Zhou Libo or Zhou Libo's Former Residence is where Zhou Libo was born and lived from 1908 to 1924. It is located in the town of Xielingang, Heshan District of Yiyang, Hunan, China. It has been designated as a cultural relics protection unit in Hunan and patriotism education base in Hunan.

History
The traditional folk house style residence was built in 1788, in the ruling of Qianlong Emperor of the Qing dynasty (1644–1911).

Zhou Libo was born here on August 9, 1908. In 1927, he left here for Changsha Provincial No. 1 High School. From 1955 to 1965, he wrote Great Changes Across the Land here.

It has been inscribed as a municipal cultural unit in 1997 and a provincial cultural unit in 2002.

Architecture
There are 28 rooms. Under the eaves is a plaque with the Chinese characters "Former Residence of Zhou Libo" written by Wu Jieping, former Vice Chairperson of the National People's Congress.

References

Buildings and structures in Yiyang
Traditional folk houses in Hunan
1788 establishments in China
Tourist attractions in Yiyang
Heshan District, Yiyang